Manic 5/Lac Louise Water Aerodrome  is located  west of the Daniel-Johnson Dam (Manic-5), Quebec, Canada.

See also
 Manic-5 Aerodrome

References

Registered aerodromes in Côte-Nord
Seaplane bases in Quebec